The 1897–98 Football League season was Aston Villa's 10th season in the Football League First Division, the top flight of English football. George Ramsay would continue in charge of Aston Villa while the  Management Committee continued to pick the team. The season fell in what was to be called Villa's golden era.

First-class cricketer and England football international, Jack Devey  was  Captain. Jimmy Crabtree also captained the team. "Diamond" Freddie Wheldon was League top scorer with 21.

Billy Garraty great-great grandfather of Jack Grealish, made his league debut for Aston Villa during the season but made just one other appearance that year.

First Division

References

Aston Villa F.C. seasons
Aston Villa F.C.